Joseph William "Jody" Gage (born November 29, 1959) is a Canadian former professional ice hockey right winger. He was drafted in the third round, 45th overall, by the Detroit Red Wings in the 1979 NHL Entry Draft.

Biography
As a youth, Gage played in the 1972 Quebec International Pee-Wee Hockey Tournament with a minor ice hockey team from Toronto.

Gage played junior hockey in the Ontario Hockey Association from 1976–79 with the St. Catharines Fincups, Hamilton Fincups, and Kitchener Rangers before turning pro in 1979–80, splitting time with the Kalamazoo Wings of the International Hockey League and the Adirondack Red Wings of the American Hockey League. In his AHL debut on October 11, 1979, Gage scored four goals in an 8-3 win over the Hershey Bears. With his help, Adirondack would win the Calder Cup championship in 1981.

Prior to the 1985–86 season, Gage signed with the Buffalo Sabres as a free agent and was assigned to the AHL's Rochester Americans, where Gage would soon become one of the important figures in the history of the franchise. His Amerks debut was a mirror image of his AHL debut in 1979, scoring four goals in a win over Hershey. In ten seasons, Gage became the Amerks' all-time leader in games played (653), points (728), goals (351), and assists (377). Gage won the Les Cunningham Award in 1987–88 after a 60-goal season (second player in league history to accomplish this feat). He was the third player in AHL history to score 1000 points, the fifth player to play 1000 AHL games, and the fifth member of the AHL's 500-goal club. Gage led Rochester to a Calder Cup in 1986–87 and back to the Calder Cup Finals in 1989–90, 1990–91, and 1992–93.

The man dubbed "Mr. Amerk" retired during the 1995–96 season and finished his AHL career with 504 goals, 1,048 points, seven 40-goal seasons, and 51 playoff goals. In 68 career NHL games with Detroit and Buffalo, Gage totaled 14 goals, 15 assists, and 26 penalty minutes. Immediately after his retirement, Gage accepted a position as Assistant General Manager and helped the Amerks capture the 1995–96 Calder Cup championship in a thrilling seven-game series over the defending champion Portland Pirates.

Gage was named General Manager of the Americans before the 1996–97 season and has since overseen five division titles, two more trips to the Calder Cup Finals, and a Macgregor Kilpatrick Trophy after a 51-win season in 2004–05. In addition to his work with the Amerks, Gage also served as GM for the Rochester Rattlers of Major League Lacrosse and was GM of the National Lacrosse League's Rochester Knighthawks until new ownership took control of both the Amerks and Knighthawks in 2008.

In 2006, Gage was a member of the inaugural induction class of the American Hockey League Hall of Fame.

On February 3, 2011, Gage was named the new general manager for the Hamilton Nationals of Major League Lacrosse.

Gage is now the Vice President of Player Personnel for the Rochester Knighthawks Lacrosse Club.

Career statistics

References

External links
 
 AHL Hall of Fame Bio

1959 births
Living people
Adirondack Red Wings players
Buffalo Sabres players
Canadian ice hockey right wingers
Detroit Red Wings draft picks
Detroit Red Wings players
Hamilton Fincups players
Ice hockey people from Toronto
Kalamazoo Wings (1974–2000) players
Kitchener Rangers players
Rochester Americans players